Furnifold McLendel Simmons (January 20, 1854April 30, 1940) was an American politicians who served as a Democratic member of the United States House of Representatives from March 4, 1887 to March 4, 1889 and U.S. senator from the state of North Carolina between March 4, 1901 and March 4, 1931. He served as chairman of the powerful Committee on Finance from March 4, 1913 to March 4, 1919. He was an unsuccessful contender for the 1920 Democratic Party nomination for president. Simmons was a staunch segregationist and white supremacist, and a leading perpetrator of the Wilmington insurrection of 1898.

Life and career
Simmons was born in Pollocksville, North Carolina, the son of Mary McLendel (Jerman) and Furnifold Greene Simmons. After Republicans won control of the North Carolina legislature in 1894, Simmons led efforts to disenfranchise black voters and return Democrats to power across the state. He allied with white supremacist newspapers to stoke fears of black men as predators of white women and too incompetent to be trusted as office holders or voters. Simmons also set up hundreds of "White Government Unions," which aimed to "announce on all occasions that they would succeed if they had to shoot every negro in the city." As a result, Democrats swept the 1898 election, and the Wilmington Insurrection of 1898 broke out the following day.

In 1901 Simmons won the Democratic nomination for the US Senate. From his Senate seat, he then ran a powerful political machine, using A. D. Watts "to keep the machine oiled back home," in the words of one journalist. Simmons remained in office for the next thirty years.

Senator Simmons refused to endorse Al Smith, the Democratic nominee for president in 1928 and the first Catholic nominated by a major party, winning him praise from members of the Ku Klux Klan.  Still, rejecting the Democratic nominee in 1928, together with the Great Depression, led to Simmons being defeated in the 1930 Democratic primary by Josiah W. Bailey, who was backed by Governor O. Max Gardner.

References

External links

North Carolina History Project
North Carolina Election of 1898
Furnifold McLendel Simmons entry at The Political Graveyard

1854 births
1940 deaths
American proslavery activists
Democratic Party United States senators from North Carolina
North Carolina Democratic Party chairs
Candidates in the 1920 United States presidential election
20th-century American politicians
Wake Forest University alumni
Politicians from New Bern, North Carolina
Democratic Party members of the United States House of Representatives from North Carolina
Activists from North Carolina
Wilmington insurrection of 1898
People from Jones County, North Carolina
American white supremacists
History of racism in North Carolina
Political violence in the United States